School District 54 Bulkley Valley is a school district in northwestern British Columbia. Centered in  Smithers, it includes the communities of Telkwa, Houston, and Witset.

History
Except for the two schools in Houston, the elementary schools in school district 54 used to be K-6 and the highschools used to be 9–12. Grade 7 and 8 students in the district used to go Chandler Park Middle School until it was closed in the summer of 2004 due to provincial budget cuts.

Schools

See also
List of school districts in British Columbia

References

"Student Headcount by Grade." Education Analytics, Government of BC. n.d. Web. Accessed 5 Apr. 2021 from: https://catalogue.data.gov.bc.ca/dataset/bc-schools-student-headcount-by-grade/resource/c1a55945-8554-4058-9019-514b16178f89 (Line 6400) 

54